Pueblo City Park is a park established in 1904 in Pueblo, Colorado. It is managed by the Pueblo Department of Parks and Recreation. When the park first opened in 1904, the Pueblo Star-Journal published a full-page description of the park under the headline "City Park, Soon To Be Opened To The Public, Will Have The Handsomest Gates In The West."

Park Features
Pueblo City Park Carousel
Pueblo City Park Zoo
Pueblo City Golf Course

References

External links
Pueblo City Park website

Parks in Colorado
Protected areas of Pueblo County, Colorado
Pueblo, Colorado
Tourist attractions in Pueblo, Colorado